Randy Bruce Traywick (born May 4, 1959), known professionally as Randy Travis, is an American country music and gospel music singer, songwriter, guitarist, and actor.

Active from 1978 until being incapacitated by a stroke in 2013, he has recorded 20 studio albums and charted more than 50 singles on the Billboard Hot Country Songs charts, including 16 that reached the No. 1 position. Considered a pivotal figure in the history of country music, Travis broke through in the mid-1980s with the release of his album Storms of Life, which sold more than four million copies. The album established him as a major force in the neotraditional country movement. Travis followed up his successful debut with a string of platinum and multi-platinum albums. He is known for his distinctive baritone vocals, delivered in a traditional style that has made him a country music star since the 1980s.

By the mid-1990s, Travis saw a decline in his chart success. In 1997, he left Warner Bros. Records for DreamWorks Records and then for Word Records, where he began recording more Christian material. Although the career shift produced only one more number-one country hit "Three Wooden Crosses", Travis went on to earn several Dove Awards, including Country Album of the Year five times. Since his stroke, which severely limited his singing and speaking ability, he has released archival recordings and made limited public appearances. In addition to his singing career, he pursued an acting career, appearing in numerous films and television series, including The Rainmaker (1997) with Matt Damon, Black Dog (1998) with Patrick Swayze, Texas Rangers (2001) with James Van Der Beek, National Treasure 2 (2007) and seven episodes of the Touched by an Angel television series. He appeared in two episodes of the crime solving television series, Matlock.

Travis sold over 25 million records and has won seven Grammy Awards, six CMA Awards, eleven ACM Awards, 10 AMA Awards, eight GMA Dove Awards, and a star on the Hollywood Walk of Fame. In 2016, Travis was inducted into the Country Music Hall of Fame.

Early life
Randy Bruce Traywick was born on May 4, 1959, in Marshville, North Carolina, as the second of six children of Bobbie (née Tucker) (May 16, 1937 – May 21, 1998), a textile factory worker, and Harold Traywick (March 31, 1933 – October 8, 2016), a horse breeder, turkey farmer, substitute school teacher, and construction business owner.

Travis and his brother, Ricky, were encouraged to pursue their musical talents by their father, who was a fan of Hank Williams, George Jones, and Lefty Frizzell. In 1967, at the age of eight, Randy began playing guitar and sang in his Church of Christ choir. Two years later, he and his brother began performing at local clubs and talent contests, calling themselves the Traywick Brothers. Although his father encouraged Travis in his pursuit of music, the two often quarreled, which was a contributing factor in Travis dropping out of high school; he later became a juvenile delinquent and was arrested for various offenses, including auto theft and burglary. However, Travis has since voiced regret for his past misdeeds.

In 1975, Randy won a talent contest at a nightclub, Country City USA, in Charlotte, North Carolina. The club's owner, Elizabeth "Lib" Hatcher, took an interest in the young singer, hired him as a cook, and gave him regular singing jobs at the club. During the late 1970s, Randy worked and sang at Country City USA. Still in his late teens, Travis had one more encounter with the law. At his hearing, the judge told Travis that if he ever saw the singer back in his court, he should be prepared to go to jail for a long time. Travis was released into the guardianship of Hatcher, who also became his manager. The two began to focus on his career full-time.

In 1978, he began recording for Paula Records. His first single with the label, "Dreamin'", was released in April 1978 and failed to chart. A second single, "She's My Woman", was released in September 1978 and spent four weeks on the Billboard Hot Country Songs chart, peaking at number 91. A full album on Paula Records was never released. Travis moved in with Hatcher, which put further strain on her already fragile marriage. She eventually left her husband and, in 1982, she and Travis moved to Nashville, Tennessee. During this time an unlikely romance began to form between the two. Travis would later comment, "I think we discovered how much we needed each other." He and Hatcher eventually came forward with their relationship and were married in a private ceremony in 1991.

Music career 

During the early 1980s, Travis was rejected by every major record label in Nashville. His early demo tapes were criticized by record executives as being "too country." To support them, Hatcher took a job as manager of a nightclub, The Nashville Palace, and hired Travis as a cook and singer, where he performed under the name Randy Ray. In 1982, Travis recorded an independent album Live at the Nashville Palace, and Hatcher used the album to secure a deal with Warner Bros. Records' Nashville branch. As part of the contract, label executives insisted they keep their romance a secret, and changed his stage name again, to Randy Travis.

In 1985, Warner Bros. Records released the single "On the Other Hand" which peaked at No. 67 on the country charts. His next single, "1982", became a Top 10 hit single. In 1986, Warner Bros. re-released "On the Other Hand", and the re-release became Travis's first No. 1 single on that chart. These songs were included on his major-label debut Storms of Life, which produced another number-one country single in "Diggin' Up Bones", plus "No Place Like Home", which held the No. 2 position on the Billboard country charts in early 1987. "On the Other Hand", "Diggin' Up Bones", and "No Place Like Home" were all co-written by Paul Overstreet. Storms of Life received its highest Recording Industry Association of America (RIAA) sales certification in 1992, when it was certified triple-platinum for shipments of 3 million copies. The album's producer was Kyle Lehning, who would also serve in this capacity for nearly all of Travis's subsequent albums. In December 1986, Travis became a member of the Grand Ole Opry.

Travis's second album for Warner Bros. was Always & Forever. Released in April 1987, it accounted for four singles, all of which made No. 1 at Billboard: "Forever and Ever, Amen" (also co-written by Overstreet), "I Won't Need You Anymore (Always and Forever)", "Too Gone Too Long", and "I Told You So", the last of which Travis wrote himself. Of these, "Forever and Ever, Amen" held the top position for three weeks. Always & Forever won Travis his first Grammy for Best Male Country Vocal Performance in 1987. Old 8×10, his third album, was issued in July 1988. Its first three singles, "Honky Tonk Moon", "Deeper Than the Holler", and "Is It Still Over?", all reached No. 1 as well, while "Promises" was less successful at No. 17. The album achieved its highest RIAA certification of double-platinum in 1996, and won Travis his second Grammy, for Best Country Vocal Performance, with Old 8x10 in 1988. This was followed by Travis's first Christmas album, An Old Time Christmas, late in 1989.

In 1989, Travis recorded a cover of "It's Just a Matter of Time", which was originally recorded by Brook Benton 30 years prior. Travis cut the song for a multi-artist tribute album titled Rock, Rhythm & Blues which was also released by Warner Bros., and persuaded the label to include it on what would become his fourth Warner album, No Holdin' Back. Travis's version of the song, produced by Richard Perry (who also provided bass vocals on it), was the lead single to that album, and charted at No. 1 on Hot Country Songs in December 1989. It was the second time that a rendition of that song had topped the country charts, as Sonny James had previously sent his version to No. 1 in 1970. Two more singles were released from No Holdin' Back: "Hard Rock Bottom of Your Heart", which became Travis's longest-lasting No. 1 single at four weeks in 1990, and "He Walked on Water", which peaked at No. 3. The album included one other cover song, "Singing the Blues", along with the track "Somewhere in My Broken Heart", co-written and later recorded by Billy Dean.

1990s
Travis's sixth studio album, Heroes & Friends, consisted almost entirely of duets. It produced two singles: "A Few Ole Country Boys" (featuring George Jones) and the title track, also the only solo cut on the album, both made top 10 on the country music charts in 1991. Other featured artists included B. B. King and Clint Eastwood. Another cut from the album was "We're Strangers Again", a duet with Tammy Wynette. Written by Merle Haggard and Leona Williams, this song originally appeared on their 1983 duets album Heart to Heart. The rendition by Travis and Wynette later appeared on the latter's Best Loved Hits compilation for Epic Records, who issued it as a single in August 1991.

Also in 1991, Travis took part in "Voices That Care", a multi-artist project that featured other top names in music for a one-off single to raise money for the allied troops in the Gulf War. He also appeared on Sesame Street that same year. The project included fellow singers Garth Brooks, Kenny Rogers, and Kathy Mattea. In addition, Travis recorded the patriotic song "Point of Light" in response to the Thousand points of light program initiated by George H. W. Bush, then President of the United States. This song was also the lead single to his seventh Warner album, High Lonesome. This album produced three more singles, all of which Travis co-wrote with fellow country singer Alan Jackson: "Forever Together", "Better Class of Losers", and "I'd Surrender All".

Warner Bros. released two volumes of a Greatest Hits package in September 1992: Greatest Hits, Volume 1 and Greatest Hits, Volume 2. One single from each compilation made No. 1 that year: "If I Didn't Have You" from Volume 1, and "Look Heart, No Hands" from Volume 2. Also released from Volume 1 was "An Old Pair of Shoes", which charted at No. 21. Later in 1992, Travis cut the album Wind in the Wire, a disc of cowboy-inspired Western music intended to accompany a television movie of the same name in which Travis appeared. This disc was his first not to produce any Top 40 country singles. Due to Wind in the Wire and other TV movies in which he starred, Travis took a hiatus from recording and touring for most of 1993. He later told Billboard magazine that "There seems to be this perception that I've completely quit".

Lehning remarked of Travis's ninth album, This Is Me, that the singer seemed "reinvigorated", while Travis himself said that the songs on it seemed more "rowdy" than those on previous albums. Four singles from this album made the charts: "Before You Kill Us All", "Whisper My Name" (which peaked at No. 1 in 1994), the title track, and "The Box". His last album for Warner was 1996's Full Circle, which featured the singles "Are We in Trouble Now" (written by Mark Knopfler), "Would I", and "Price to Pay", the last of which failed to reach the country top 40. Also in 1996, Travis covered Roger Miller's "King of the Road" for the soundtrack to Traveller. This rendition, issued by Asylum Records, spent 15 weeks on the country charts despite only peaking at No. 51.

In 1998, Travis won his third Grammy for Best Country Collaboration with Vocals for Same Old Train. He then signed to DreamWorks Records later in 1998, where he issued You and You Alone. For this album, Travis co-produced with Byron Gallimore (best known for his work with Tim McGraw) and James Stroud. Featured artists on the disc included Vince Gill, Alison Krauss, and Melba Montgomery. Actor Patrick Swayze also contributed backing vocals on the track "I Did My Part". Its singles were "Out of My Bones", "The Hole", "Spirit of a Boy, Wisdom of a Man" (co-written by former Styx member Glen Burtnik), and "Stranger in My Mirror". His only other DreamWorks album, A Man Ain't Made of Stone, followed in 1999. Also co-produced by Stroud and Gallimore, it produced a Top 20 hit in its title track, but three other singles all failed to make top 40.

2000s
Travis's career from 2000 onward was dominated by Christian country music. His first full album in the genre, 2000's Inspirational Journey, was issued via Word Records. One cut from this album, "Baptism", was originally recorded by Kenny Chesney as a duet with Travis on Chesney's 1999 album Everywhere We Go. The version appearing on Inspirational Journey, a solo rendition by Travis, charted at No. 75 on the country charts in late 2000. Following the September 11, 2001 terrorist attacks, Travis recorded the patriotic song "America Will Always Stand", which charted via distribution from Relentless Records.

Travis's most successful venture in Christian country music was "Three Wooden Crosses". Released in December 2002 as the lead single to his album Rise and Shine, that song became his sixteenth and final No. 1 single in early 2003. It was followed by Worship & Faith, consisting mostly of gospel standards, in 2003. This album earned an RIAA gold certification three years after its release. In addition, Rise and Shine and Worship & Faith earned Travis his fourth and fifth Grammys in 2003 and 2004, respectively, with Travis taking home the award for Best Southern, Country, or Bluegrass Gospel Album in both years. Next came Passing Through, which accounted for his last solo chart entries in "Four Walls" and "Angels". Glory Train: Songs of Faith, Worship, and Praise in 2005 also consisted largely of gospel covers, while his second Christmas album, Songs of the Season, followed in 2007. Travis won his sixth Grammy, for Glory Train, for Best Southern, Country, or Bluegrass Gospel Album of the year in 2006.

Around the Bend in 2008 returned Travis to a traditional country style, coinciding with a return to Warner Bros. Nashville. Stephen Thomas Erlewine noted of Travis's career in the preceding years that his turn to Christian music "was fruitful, producing a series of good, heartfelt records, yet they also had a nice side effect of putting commercialism way on the back burner, as the gospel albums were made without the charts in mind" while adding that Around the Bend "stands apart from trends, not defiantly but comfortably." In 2009, Carrie Underwood covered "I Told You So" with Travis on duet vocals, and this collaborative version charted at No. 2 on the country charts and won Travis his seventh Grammy for Best Country Collaboration with Vocals. Travis released two more covers albums in 2013 and 2014: Influence Vol. 1: The Man I Am, and Influence Vol. 2: The Man I Am.

In 2016, Travis was selected as one of 30 artists to appear in the music video for "Forever Country", a mash-up track of "Take Me Home, Country Roads", "On the Road Again", and "I Will Always Love You", which celebrates 50 years of the CMA Awards.

Travis's autobiography, Forever and Ever Amen, co-written by Ken Abraham, was released on May 14, 2019.

On February 28, 2020, Travis released Precious Memories (Worship & Faith) through Bill Gaither's Music label, which contained 12 songs that were recorded in 2003 at the Calvary Assembly of God Church in Orlando, Florida. In July 2020, Travis released "Fool's Love Affair," using his original demo vocal track from the early 1980s.

Personal life
Travis and Elizabeth Hatcher divorced on October 29, 2010, after a 19-year marriage, and their business relationship ended thereafter. He married Mary Davis on March 21, 2015.

Legal issues in 2012
Travis was arrested in February 2012, when he was found in a parked car outside of a church in Sanger, Texas, with an open bottle of wine and smelling of alcohol.

On August 7, 2012, state troopers in Grayson County, Texas, responded to a call that an unclothed man was lying in the road. Troopers reported that they arrived to find Travis unclothed and smelling of alcohol. The Texas Highway Patrol said that Travis crashed his car in a construction zone, and that when they attempted to apprehend him, Travis threatened the lives of the troopers. Travis was subsequently arrested for driving while intoxicated and terroristic threat against a public servant. He posted bail in the amount of $21,500. Earlier in the same evening, just prior to the DUI arrest, Travis allegedly walked into a Tiger Mart convenience store naked, demanding cigarettes from the cashier, who in turn called the authorities. According to the store clerk, Travis left the store upon realizing he did not have any money to pay for the cigarettes.

Travis filed a lawsuit to block police dash cam video of the incident from being released. After a five year legal battle, a judge ruled that the video did not violate his right to privacy, and the video was released to the public in December 2017.

On January 31, 2013, Travis pleaded guilty to driving while intoxicated in the August 7 incident and received two years' probation, a $2,000 fine and a 180-day suspended jail sentence.

Illness in 2013
On July 7, 2013, Travis was admitted to a Dallas-area hospital for viral cardiomyopathy after a viral upper respiratory infection. His condition was classified as critical. Three days later, Travis suffered a massive stroke, then underwent surgery to relieve pressure on his brain. Within the next five days, Travis was awake and alert after undergoing brain surgery, and his heart was pumping without the assistance of machines — an assumption that he would make a full recovery. He was released from Baylor Heart Hospital in Plano, Texas, on July 31, and entered a physical therapy facility. Following his stroke, and despite therapy, Travis suffered from aphasia and used a cane for more than a year. By November 2014, he was recovering, could walk short distances without assistance, and was re-learning to write and play guitar, according to his then-fiancée Mary Travis.

In 2016, it was reported he recovered his voice after about three years of rehabilitation and therapy, and could perform again. He attended his induction into the Country Music Hall of Fame on October 16, 2016, and performed a rendition of "Amazing Grace". Despite the 2016 reports, it was clear at the Hall of Fame induction ceremony that Travis was far from recovered.  In 2017, Travis acknowledged that he had sustained permanent damage including a disabled right hand, limited speech, and severely impacted singing ability.  While he continues to make public appearances, Travis no longer sings. He appeared on-stage with Michael Ray during a cover performance of "Forever and Ever Amen" in June 2017, to which Travis contributed the final "Amen." He did the same during his 60th birthday party, thrown by the Grand Ole Opry on May 4, 2019.

In September 2019, Travis announced his return to touring. The tour features James Dupré as lead vocalist singing the repertoire with Travis's backing band, with Travis having a limited presence similar to his one-off appearances since 2017. Announced as a 12-city tour, it was cut back to three concerts shortly before the tour began in October "due to unexpected production and technical issues related to the elaborate content of the show," with the intent to reschedule the canceled shows after the technical problems are resolved.

Travis also released a new song in 2020, "Fools Love Affair". It was recorded near the beginning of his career, but it was his first song to be on the radio since his stroke.

Discography 

Storms of Life (1986)
Always & Forever (1987)
Old 8×10 (1988)
No Holdin' Back (1989) 
An Old Time Christmas (1989)
Heroes & Friends (1990)
High Lonesome (1991)
Wind in the Wire (1993)
This Is Me (1994)
Full Circle (1996)
You and You Alone (1998)
A Man Ain't Made of Stone (1999)
Inspirational Journey (2000)
Rise and Shine (2002)
Worship & Faith (2003)
Passing Through (2004)
Glory Train: Songs of Faith, Worship, and Praise (2005)
Songs of the Season (2007)
Around the Bend (2008)
Anniversary Celebration (2011)
Influence Vol. 1: The Man I Am (2013)
Influence Vol. 2: The Man I Am (2014)
Precious Memories (Worship & Faith) (2020)

Filmography

Television

Film

Awards

Further reading

References

External links 

 

1959 births
American baritones
American country singer-songwriters
American male singer-songwriters
Country Music Hall of Fame inductees
Country musicians from North Carolina
American country guitarists
American acoustic guitarists
American male guitarists
DreamWorks Records artists
Grammy Award winners
Grand Ole Opry members
Living people
Singer-songwriters from North Carolina
North Carolina Republicans
People from Marshville, North Carolina
Warner Records artists
20th-century American guitarists
People from Grayson County, Texas
20th-century American male musicians
Singer-songwriters from Texas